Count Sándor Apponyi de Nagyappony (19 January 1844 – 18 April 1925) was a Hungarian diplomat, bibliophile, bibliographer and great book collector.

Born in Paris, where his father, Count Rudolf Apponyi, was a diplomat, Sándor also became a diplomat. After his father's death he moved to Hungary, and improved his collection. He married Alexandra Esterházy.

Working as a Hungarian diplomat in London and Paris he was able to meet many great book lovers who inspired him to collect old printed books, especially works about Hungary by foreign writers. He purchased books from foreign and Hungarian antiquarians and at auction. Thus he was able to amass a collection of interesting historical, arithmetical, biological, geographical and philosophical works in many languages: German, French, Italian, Turkish, Dutch, English and Latin. Known as the Apponyi Hungarika, this fine collection is now held in the National Széchényi Library, Budapest, and contains about 3,000 books on a wide range of interesting topics. We can read about  the siege and taking of Buda or Belgrade by the Christian army and about Rákóczi's War of Independence. Also there is a book by Count Luigi Ferdinando Marsigli about coffee, from the planting of the shrub to the serving of the drink.

As he had family links through his ancestry with Isotta Nogarola, one of the most famous female humanists of the Italian Renaissance, Sándor Apponyi collected books about her era. This small collection of about 300 works is named Apponyi Rariora. In it can be found the same breadth of topics as in the Apponyi Hungarika, but it is focused on the Italian city of Verona.

He compiled a catalogue of his books in which he added comments to the bibliographical data.

A special law was adopted in 1926 by the Hungarian National Assembly to acknowledge the donation of the collection: it mentions several other comparable donations but adds that "Among all these generous, valuable donations, that of Count [Sándor] Apponyi is by far the most important."

Count Sándor Apponyi owned the Castle of Lengyel in Southern Transdanubia, which was later transformed into a school. A bust of him stands in front of the building.

References

1844 births
1925 deaths
Hungarian bibliographers
Hungarian diplomats
Sandor